Aedia leucomelas, the eastern alchymist, sweet potato leaf worm or sorcerer, is a moth of the family Noctuidae. It is found in large parts of the world, ranging from Europe all over Asia up to Japan and some African countries. The subspecies Aedia leucomelas acronyctoides is found in Australia.

Description
Antennae of male almost simple. Forelegs of male lack scaly tufts and long fringes. Body fuscous. Thorax and forewings suffused with olive or white. Forewings with indistinct sub-basal and waved antemedial lines. There are traces of orbicular, reniform, and claviform spots. A postmedial double waved line slightly excurved beyond cell. Traces of an irregular sub-marginal lines present, along with a marginal black specks series. Hindwings pure white, where the inner margin fuscous suffused. Outer half of wings black with white patches at apex and anal angle. Ventral side of forewings with basal two thirds white, with spot at end of cell.

The moth flies from June to September depending on the location. The larvae mainly feed on Convolvulus species, including C. sepium, C. erubescens and C. arvensis, but also on Ipomoea pes-caprae, Ipomoea batatas and perhaps Chondrilla juncea.

Gallery

References

External links

Lepiforum e.V.

Catocalini
Moths described in 1758
Moths of Europe
Moths of Asia
Moths of Africa
Moths of Australia
Taxa named by Carl Linnaeus